This article presents the insignia and ranks of the Brazilian military. The insignia and ranks of the Brazilian military are defined by Act no. 6880 of December 9, 1980. The following ranks show Brazil's military insignia and its corresponding NATO codes.

Air Force ranks date from 1941, when the Brazilian Air Force was organized as a merger of the Navy's Aeronaval Force and the Army's Aviation Service.

Rank table
The shoulder epaulette pads from Navy and Air Force indicate both rank and specialty branch. The air force examples below are shown without branch designation marks on the epaulettes, with the exception of the ranks of Marshal of the Air Force and Air Chief Marshal, which can only be occupied by aviators. Army shoulder pads do not represent branch, as this is indicated elsewhere in the uniform like on the cuff and sleeves of the dress and everyday uniforms.

The Military Police alongside the Military Firefighters Corps are classed as an auxiliary and reserve forces of the Army.

Officers

NCO and enlisted grades

See also 
 Military rank
 Comparative military ranks

Notes

External links